František Běhounek (27 October 1898 Prague – 1 January 1973 Karlovy Vary) was a Czech scientist (radiologist), explorer and writer.
The asteroid 3278 Běhounek is named after him.

Biography 
Běhounek studied physics and mathematics at Charles University, later radiology in France with Marie Curie-Skłodowska. In 1920s, he was one of the founders of State Radiological Institute. In 1926, he took part in an expedition of Roald Amundsen to the North Pole with airship Norge. In 1928, as an expert on cosmic rays, he was a member of crew of airship Italia led by Umberto Nobile. He survived its crash in 1928, and later described it in his book Trosečníci na kře ledové.

As a scientist, he worked in industrial companies, medical institutions, universities and in the state academy. From the 1950s on, he participated in UNESCO projects.

Works 
Běhounek published about 28 novels (most of them aimed at young people, popularizing science or science fiction) and many scientific works.
Boj o zeměkouli – sci-fi novel (Prague, 1939)
Svět nejmenších rozměrů  (Prague, 1945)
Případ profesora Hrona – sci-fi novel (Prague, 1947)
Swansonova výprava – sci-fi novel (Prague, 1949)
Tajemství polárního moře – adventure novel about a north pole expedition (Prague, 1942)
Akce L – sci-fi novel (1956)
Robinsoni vesmíru – sci-fi novel (1958)        
Tábor v lese (Prague, 1960)
Kletba zlata – short stories (Prague, 1942)
Projekt Scavenger – sci-fi novel (Prague, 1961)

References

External links
 Biography concentrated on explorer and writer (in Czech)

1898 births
1973 deaths
Czech physicists
Czech male writers
Czech science fiction writers
Czech explorers
Scientists from Prague
Charles University alumni